Faisal Al Bannai is an Emirati business executive who is known as a leader in defence technology and advanced research. He also serves as Secretary General of the Advanced Technology Research Council (ATRC) and Chairman of the Board of Directors of EDGE Group.

Career 
Faisal Al Bannai is currently Chairman of the Board of Directors of EDGE Group, an advanced technology group based in the UAE that develops disruptive solutions for defence and beyond. EDGE, a state-owned conglomerate, was publicly made known by Mohammed bin Zayed Al Nahyan, the Crown Prince of Abu Dhabi.

Alongside his position at EDGE, Al Bannai is Secretary-General of the Advanced Technology Research Council (ATRC), the overarching entity mandated to shape a research and development ecosystem in Abu Dhabi and drive the strategic R&D priorities of the UAE to position the country as an international research and development hub. He is also a Member of the Board of Trustees of Khalifa University.

In his role as Secretary-General of the ATRC, Al Bannai is also a member of the Emirates Research and Development Council, chaired by His Highness Sheikh Abdullah bin Zayed Al Nahyan. The Council aims to strengthen the governance of the UAE’s research and development sector and to unify efforts and monitor performance in this field.

Technology Innovation Institute (TII) (2020–present)

In November 2020, Al Bannai announced the launch of the Technology Innovation Institute (TII). TII is a global research and development centre focused on applied research and new-age technology. As the applied research arm of ATRC, TII has seven initial research centres focused on advanced materials, autonomous robotics, cryptography, digital security, directed energy, quantum, and secure systems. Al Bannai works closely with Dr Ray O. Johnson, TII’s CEO in leading its 375+ scientists towards realizing TII’s goals.

ASPIRE (2020–present)

Also in November 2020, Al Bannai announced ASPIRE, ATRC’s programme management pillar. Working with cross-sector industry stakeholders, ASPIRE focuses on fast tracking research solutions to market through shaping and supporting challenges and international competitions. Al Bannai works closely with Dr Arthur Morrish, ASPIRE’s CEO in allocating funds to research projects.

Advanced Technology Research Council (ATRC) (2020–present)

In August 2020, Al Bannai was appointed as the Secretary-General of the Advanced Technology Research Council, the overarching entity mandated to shape the research and development ecosystem in Abu Dhabi as well as direct the UAE’s research priorities. In this role, he is responsible for leading the strategy to create Abu Dhabi’s R & D ecosystem and strengthen its knowledge economy through its two pillars: Technology Innovation Institute and ASPIRE.

EDGE Group (2019–present)

In November 2019, Al Bannai was appointed as CEO and Managing Director of EDGE Group, which specializes in defense, smart technology, and research and development [5][8]. The company comprises four clusters with over 25 entities. In this role, he is responsible for setting the company’s strategic direction and managing overall operations in cooperation with its board of directors. He is further tasked with leading, guiding, directing, and evaluating the work of other executive leaders in realizing the wider goals of the organisation.

Most recently, Al Bannai expressed pride over the EDGE Group ranking 24th in Defense News’ Top 100 List of defense companies, the first Middle Eastern country to do so.

In January 2022, Al Bannai was appointed as Chairman of the Board of Directors of EDGE Group.

DarkMatter (2014-2019)

In 2014, Al Bannai founded DarkMatter, a cybersecurity service provider, where he assumed the position of Chief Executive Officer. He led the company’s long-term growth strategy while overseeing its day-to-day operations, including ground-breaking research and development initiatives. Under his leadership, DarkMatter expanded into a US$400 million business with over 650 employees and branches in three countries. In April 2018, Al Bannai became Founder & Managing Director of DarkMatter, but later announced in October 2019 that he would divest his entire stake in the company.

Axiom Telecom (1997-2016)

After finishing his education abroad, Al Bannai founded and established Axiom Telecom in 1997, which is known today as the Middle East's largest distributor of mobile devices. He served as the Managing Director at Axiom Telecom. The company currently employs a workforce of more than 2,500 professionals across the Gulf region and has an annual turnover of US $2.5 billion.

After having served as its Chief Executive Officer for 19 years, Al Bannai stepped down to become Axiom Telecom’s Managing Director in 2016.13

He has been member of the board of Axiom Telecom since 2005.

Board positions 
Since 2005, member of the board, Axiom Telecom.

In April 2020, Al Bannai assumed the additional role as a member of the Board of Trustees of Khalifa University of Science and Technology.

In May 2020, he was named Secretary General of Advanced Technology Research Council (ATRC), issued by Law No.14 for 2020 by UAE President, His Highness Sheikh Khalifa bin Zayed Al Nahyan while retaining his various other positions and role as CEO of EDGE.

In October 2020, Al Bannai became a Board Member with the UAE Space Agency.

In April 2021, he was appointed as a Board Member at the United Arab Emirates University.

In January 2022, Al Bannai was appointed as Chairman of the Board of Directors of EDGE Group.

In January 2022, Al Bannai was appointed as a Board Member of the Emirates Research and Development Council.

Education
Al Bannai graduated with a Bachelor's degree in Finance from Boston University. He has also earned a Master's degree in Shipping Trade and Finance from City, University of London.

Honors 
 Lifetime Achievement Award (2005) from Sheikh Sheikh Mohammed bin Rashid Al Maktoum, the Vice President and Prime Minister of the United Arab Emirates.
 Arabian Business Entrepreneur of the Year (2005).
 Technology Business Leader of the Year (2017) at the Gulf Business Awards.
 Gulf Business’ 100 Most Powerful Arabs list.
 Forbes list of Top CEOs in the Middle East (2021).

See also
EDGE Group
Axiom Telecom
Technology Innovation Institute

References

Living people
Emirati business executives
Year of birth missing (living people)